Coyle is an unincorporated community in Jefferson County, in the U.S. state of Washington.

History
A post office called Coyle was established in 1908, and remained in operation until 1928. The community was named after George Coyle, an early settler.

References

Unincorporated communities in Jefferson County, Washington
Unincorporated communities in Washington (state)